Dulce Maria Alavez (born April 25, 2014 – disappeared September 16, 2019) is an American girl who vanished near a playground in Bridgeton, New Jersey and is believed to have been abducted. A reward has been offered for finding Alavez.

Disappearance  
On September 16, 2019, 5-year-old Dulce Maria Alavez and her brother were playing on the swings, while Alavez's pregnant mother was in her car, 30 yards away. She was playing a scratch-off lottery ticket and helping her younger sister with her homework. It was around 4 pm to 5 pm (ET) when Alavez suddenly vanished from the playground. Alavez's mother went to see where her children were and found Alavez’s brother by himself crying at the swings.

Search and aftermath
Over 30 police officers were part of a search party who looked in the nearby woods, but found nothing. The suspect is described as a light-skinned Hispanic male to 5'8 and driving a red van. Police have no strong suspects as of February 27, 2022.

Dr. Phil and In Pursuit with John Walsh carried segments about the disappearance.

In February 2021 following leads, a search for Alavez was conducted in Austintown, Ohio.

In 2020 a false claim that Alavez had been located deceased was spread on social media. In 2021, along with the National Center for Missing and Exploited Children releasing two age-progression images of Alavez as a seven-year-old, FBI special agent Daniel Garrabrant said, "The offender that took Dulce was likely there for a period of time. It was a crime of opportunity. They were looking for a child, maybe their age or gender."

See also
List of people who disappeared

References 

2010s missing person cases
Kidnapped American children
Missing person cases in New Jersey
People from Bridgeton, New Jersey
September 2019 events in the United States